Francisco F. Claver, S.J. (20 January 1926 – 1 July 2010) was a Filipino Jesuit priest, appointed and consecrated first bishop of the Roman Catholic Diocese of Malaybalay in the Philippines.

Early life and education 
Bishop Francisco F. Claver "Ikoy" was born in the province of Bontoc, Mountain Province and was one of the most influential people of the Cordilleras who stood by Human Rights and was a foe to the martial law regime.

Claver completed a master's degree in Anthropology in the Ateneo de Manila and finished his doctorate in the University of Colorado.

Priesthood 
Ordained to the priesthood on 18 June 1961, he was appointed as the bishop of what is now the Malaybalay Diocese on 18 June 1969 and was consecrated on 22 August 1969. Claver resigned in 1984, but was appointed Apostolic Vicar of the inchoate Apostolic Vicariate of Bontoc-Lagawe, Philippines retiring on 15 April 2004.

Claver's ecclesiology emphasized the importance of a participatory Church that is necessary in carrying out the aggiornamento called for by the Second Vatican Council. He believed that the Basic Ecclesial Communities (BECs) or the Basic Christian Communities (BCCs) are the primary and particular embodiment and vehicles of participation and Church renewal.

Death 
Claver died at age 81 on July 1, 2010.

Notes

External links

Inquirer: First Igorot bishop, martial law foe dies; 81

1926 births
2010 deaths
20th-century Roman Catholic bishops in the Philippines
Ateneo de Manila University alumni
20th-century Filipino Jesuits
People from Mountain Province
21st-century Roman Catholic bishops in the Philippines